Bernabé Piedrabuena may refer to:
 Bernabé Piedrabuena (bishop) (1863–1942), Argentine bishop
 Bernabé Piedrabuena (soldier) (died 1841), Argentine general and governor of Tucuman Province